Barbara (German: Barbara - Wild wie das Meer) is a 1961 West German drama film directed by Frank Wisbar and starring Harriet Andersson, Maria Sebaldt and Carl Lange. The film is adapted from the 1939 novel of the same title by Jørgen-Frantz Jacobsen. It was shot at studios in Copenhagen while location shooting took place in the Faroe Islands where the film is set.

Cast
 Harriet Andersson as Barbara
 Maria Sebaldt as Vupsen
 Carl Lange as Amtmann Heyde
 Helmut Griem as Paul
 Hans Nielsen as Mikkelsen
 Josef Albrecht as Henry
 Erika Dannhoff as Sophie
 Jens Due as Tanzender Gast
 Erich Dunskus as Harpunen-Olaf
 Tilla Durieux as Armgart
 Hans Elwenspoek as Pastor
 Herbert Fleischmann as Gabriel
 Günter Lüdke as Tanfloh
 Nora Minor as Barbara's Mutter
 Hans Paetsch as Inselvogt Harme	
 Xenia Pörtner as Susanne
 Renate Rolfs as 	Angelika
 Erik Schumann as Dr. Nielsson
 Hans von Borsody as Andreas
 Henrik Wiehe as Seeoffizier

References

Bibliography 
 Henry Nicolella. Frank Wisbar: The Director of Ferryman Maria, from Germany to America and Back. McFarland, 2018.
 James Robert Parish & Michael R. Pitts. Film directors: a guide to their American films. Scarecrow Press, 1974.

External links 
 

1961 films
West German films
German drama films
1961 drama films
1960s German-language films
Films directed by Frank Wisbar
UFA GmbH films
Films shot in the Faroe Islands
1960s German films